Edalorhina nasuta (common snouted frog) is a species of frog in the family Leptodactylidae.
It is endemic to Peru.
Its natural habitats are subtropical or tropical moist lowland forests and intermittent freshwater marshes.
It is threatened by habitat loss.

References

Edalorhina
Amphibians of Peru
Endemic fauna of Peru
Amphibians described in 1912
Taxonomy articles created by Polbot